School District 46 Sunshine Coast is a school district in British Columbia, Canada. It covers an area in the Sunshine Coast region northwest of Greater Vancouver, including the communities of Gibsons, and Sechelt.

The school district has a significant number of students with First Nations, Métis, and  Inuit ancestry.  It operates within the traditional territories of the shíshálh (Sechelt) Nation and the Skwxwu7mesh uxwumixw (Squamish Nation) and works with these First Nations to provide Aboriginal Programs and Services, including the sháshishálhem (shíshálh) Language and Culture Program.  In partnership with the Sechelt Indian Band Education Department, these are offered at both elementary and secondary schools.

Schools

School board
The current school board was elected in October 2022 for a four-year term.

 Amanda Amaral (Board Chair)
 Sue Giraard
 Samantha Haines (BCSTA Provincial Councillor)
 Maria Hampvent
 Stacia Leech (Vice-chair)
 Pammila Ruth (BCPSEA Trustee Representative)
 Ann Skelcher

See also
List of school districts in British Columbia

References

External links
BC Ministry of Education school information

Sunshine Coast Regional District
46